"Atrévete-te-te" is a Grammy-nominated song by Puerto Rican urban duo Calle 13 from their eponymous debut album Calle 13, released in February 2006, by White Lion Records. It is one of the duo's best known songs. It was a hit single in many Latin American countries. The video for this single won the Latin Grammy Award for Best Short Form Music Video at the Latin Grammy Awards of 2006. This song is featured in the soundtrack of Grand Theft Auto IV. The song was later named the second best single of the decade by Latin music website Club Fonograma.

Song information
"Atrévete-te-te" is based on a Colombian cumbia beat and a clarinet riff also typical of traditional music from Colombia's coast. It was especially popular in that country.

The lyrics found in the song contain Spanglish words such as "estárter" and anglicisms such as lighter and wiper are used to create rhymes, a reflection of the use of English on the island due to Puerto Rico's status as a Commonwealth in free association with the United States. The song has been featured in an MTV Tres commercial.

It was used in a version of the song for Manuel Rosales' 2006 presidential campaign in Venezuela. Rosales' campaign motto was Atrévete.

Pop culture references
The song makes several references to different pop culture themes, such as:

 The Japanese videogame Street Fighter
 The British rock band Coldplay
 The American punk rock band Green Day
 The 2003 Quentin Tarantino film, Kill Bill: Volume 1
 The music genre, Latino punk

Agüeybaná, the last indigenous cacique in Puerto Rico's history is also mentioned, as are the cities of Bayamón and Guaynabo, Puerto Rico (this last one mentioned as to reinforce the song subject's aloofness and scorn for Latino and Puerto Rican influences, versus her liking of the rather "foreign" references mentioned above). The dancers on the song's video are Marilyn Monroe lookalikes, each dressed in blonde wig and a skimpier version of Monroe's famed The Seven Year Itch dress.

Credits and personnel
 Vocals: René Pérez
 Production: Eduardo Cabra
 Lyrics: René Pérez
 Instruments: clarinet, bass, dembow
 Mixing: Colin Michaels

Chart performance
The song became a big success on the Billboard Hot Latin Songs chart, peaking at number 15. It also peaked at number six on the U.S. "Latin Tropical Airplay" chart.

Charts

Certifications

References

2006 songs
Calle 13 (band) songs
Spanish-language songs
2006 singles
Latin Grammy Award for Best Short Form Music Video
Songs written by Residente